The East Peak Fire is a forest fire that began east of the East Spanish Peak near La Veta, Colorado at 5:10 PM on Wednesday, June 19, 2013. The fire was originally named the Scout Ranch Fire because the fire was first reported by the Spanish Peaks Scout Ranch.

Events 
The fire was first noticed by a Boy Scout on Wednesday, June 19 at Spanish Peaks Scout Ranch who saw smoke in the distance by the kitchen area of the camp, and a staffer who went closer to investigate and could see visible flames.
All the Boy Scouts plus staff camping at Spanish Peaks Scout Ranch quickly evacuated the camp because the staff and scouts drill for such events. Many went to the open shelter at John Mall High School in Walsenburg, Colorado where The American Red Cross supplied food and blankets, and some left to go home after staying the night. Troop 369 took a stop at Carl's Jr. to use the bathroom and recollect before going to the high school. Some Boy Scout members had to be rescued by a helicopter due them hiking up a mountain that week.

Strong winds resulted in the fire making runs to the east and southeast. The entire town of Walsenburg was placed under pre-evacuation status. On Friday, June 21, officials reported the fire to be  and that at The Spanish Peaks Scout Ranch 9 structures and 4 out-buildings had been destroyed.

On July 9, the fire was contained after burning  of land with Walsenburg undamaged.

See also
2013 Colorado wildfires
Black Forest fire, another wildfire in Colorado beginning the week before
Royal Gorge fire, another wildfire in Colorado beginning the week before
List of Colorado wildfires

References

Wildfires in Colorado
2013 wildfires in the United States
2013 in Colorado